Thomas Lincoln Tally (1861 – November 24, 1945) on or near April 16, 1902, opened the Electric Theatre in Los Angeles, the first movie theatre in that city and the first movie theater in California known to have been built from the ground up inside a larger building on the ground floor. (Photographs exist but rights are not available).

With James Dixon Williams he founded First National Pictures. He was the first to show a color movie in Los Angeles in 1912, and the first to sign Charlie Chaplin and Mary Pickford to movie contracts.

Lawsuits
Tally v. Ganahl, 151 California Supreme Court 418 (1907)

Notes

References

1861 births
1945 deaths
American film producers